Staten Island Heights is a predominantly flat, ice-covered upland between the Greenville and Alatna Valleys in the Convoy Range of Victoria Land. Mapped by United States Geological Survey (USGS) from ground surveys and Navy air photos. Named by Advisory Committee on Antarctic Names (US-ACAN) in 1964 for the USS Staten Island, an icebreaker in the American convoy to McMurdo Sound in several seasons beginning in 1956–57.

See also 
 List of antarctic and sub-antarctic islands

Islands of Victoria Land
Scott Coast